Defend It is the third studio album by Beenie Man.

Track listing
"Wicked Man" – 3:37
"No Matter Di Money" – 3:41
"Cross the Bridge" – 3:39
"Bomb & Dynamite" – 3:50
"Life Is Good" – 3:44
"Defend It" – 3:48
"God Mek Everything" – 3:58
"People Dead" – 3:54
"Child Abuse" – 3:50
"Accident a Cause" – 3:37
"Say the Word" – 3:39
"Tea Time" (featuring Shirley McLean) – 3:34
"I Am a Disciple" – 3:30
"Nuh Tek It" – 3:42
"From Yu a Di Wife" – 3:50

References 

Beenie Man albums
1994 albums
Dancehall albums
VP Records albums